Yanina Kuskova (born 11 December 2001) is an Uzbekistani professional racing cyclist, who last rides for the UCI Women's Team .

Career
Kuskova was on a team camp training when they rode the Germenica Grand Prix Road Race WE as part of the national team in 2021. Kuskova finished in tenth place as the best young rider. In March of 2022 Kuskova took her first international win at the Grand Prix Mediterrennean WE. During the 2022 Asian Road Cycling Championships Kuskova rode the Under-23 time trial with a time of 34:08 beating the second place by 2:32 and securring a gold medal. Uzbekistan earned three medals at the 2022 Asian Track Cycling Championships all of them earned by Kuskova. After the Asian Cycling Championships Kuskova did not start a UCI road event until the Ladies Tour of Estonia in late May. The race ended with a solo winner and a bunch sprint for second to eleventh, with Kuskova finishing in eleventh 1:04 down on the winner.

Major results
Sources:

Road

2019
 1st  National Junior Time trial
2020
 National Road Championships
1st  Time trial
1st  Road race
2021
 National Road Championships
1st  Time trial
1st  Road race
 2nd Grand Prix Velo Alanya WE
 8th Grand Prix Gündoğmuş WE
 10th Germenica Grand Prix Road Race WE
2022
 Asian Road Cycling Championships
1st  Team time trial
1st  Under-23 Individual time trial
6th Elite Road race
 National Road Championships
4th Road race
5th Time trial
 1st Grand Prix Mediterrennean WE
 3rd Grand Prix Gazipaşa WE
 4th Overall Princess Anna Vasa Tour
2023
 1st Expo Kriteryum 
 1st Poreč Trophy LADIES 
 4th Aphrodite Cycling Race ITT
 5th Aphrodite Cycling Race - Women for future

Track
2021
 1st  National Omnium Championship
2022
 Islamic Solidarity Games
2nd Individual pursuit
2nd Points race
 Asian Track Cycling Championships
3rd  Individual pursuit 
3rd  Points race 
3rd  Madison (with Nafosat Kozieva)

References

External links

2001 births
Living people
Uzbekistani female cyclists
Place of birth missing (living people)
21st-century Uzbekistani women